BITE Beauty is a Canadian cosmetics company specializing in lip products. The brand was founded by Susanne Langmuir in 2011, launched in 2012, and acquired by Kendo in 2014. The brand is carried exclusively at Sephora.

All BITE's products are made with food-grade, vegan ingredients and are infused with resveratrol. The factory is located in Toronto; in 2015, around 2000 pieces a day were produced.

As of 2022, BITE Beauty ceased to exist. BITE Beauty now operates as "Lip.Lab", a brick-and-mortar retailtainment experience where customers can create their own lipsticks choose the texture, scent, case color and have a selected name engraved on the lipstick tube and lip balms. As of December 2022, there are 10 lip labs in operation: two boutique in New York City, Soho (the flagship store) and Williamsburg, one in Toronto. Two boutiques in California, one in Irvine, the second San Diego. Boutiques in San Francisco, and Los Angeles became victims of the COVID-19 pandemic and closed. A boutique at Fashion Show Mall, Las Vegas. A boutique at Mall of America, Minnesota. A boutique at Northpark Center, Dallas. A partnered location in Paris at the world famous La Bon Marche. The most recent addition in Downtown Nashville. Guest may also create lipsticks online with a virtual experience. Most locations offer private events for groups of all sizes and ages for a small with a nominal party fee. First Lipstick is $60(USD) with any additional lipsticks at $40(USD). Replacement lipsticks can be ordered online or in store and cost $40(USD).

References

Cosmetics companies of Canada
Cosmetics brands
Canadian companies established in 2011
LVMH brands